Idolatteria mydros is a species of moth of the family Tortricidae. It is found in Loja Province, Ecuador.

The length of the forewings is about 11 mm. The forewings are reddish orange with iridescent bluish dark brown markings, separated by cream-white interspaces. The hindwings are red orange with black spots.

References

Moths described in 1966
Archipini